New Zealand competed at the 2014 Summer Youth Olympics, in Nanjing, China from 16 August to 28 August 2014.

Medalists

Basketball

New Zealand qualified a boys' team based on the 1 June 2014 FIBA 3x3 National Federation Rankings.

Boys' Tournament

Roster
 Isaac Davidson
 Izayah Mauriohooho-Le'afa
 Ray Penny
 Sam Timmins

Group Stage

Round of 16

Knockout Stage

Beach Volleyball

New Zealand qualified a boys' team by their performance at the AVC Qualification Tournament.

Canoeing

New Zealand qualified one boat based on its performance at the 2013 World Junior Canoe Sprint and Slalom Championships.

Girls

Equestrian

New Zealand qualified a rider.

Fencing

New Zealand qualified one athlete based on its performance at the 2014 FIE Cadet World Championships.

Boys

Mixed Team

Field Hockey

New Zealand qualified a boys' and girls' team based on its performance at the Oceania Qualification Tournament.

Boys' Tournament

Roster

 David Brydon
 Robbie Capizzi
 Fynn Edwards
 Richmond Lum
 Dominic Newman
 Hayden Phillips
 Aidan Sarikaya
 Dylan Thomas
 Mac Wilcox

Group Stage

Quarterfinal

Crossover

5th and 6th place

Girls' Tournament

Roster

 Isla Bint
 Frances Davies
 Ella Hyatt Brown
 Bridget Kiddle
 Su Arn Kwek
 Tyler Lench
 Catherine Tinning
 Casey-Mae Waddell
 Tayla White

Group Stage

Quarterfinal

Crossover

Fifth and sixth place

Golf

New Zealand qualified one team of two athletes based on the 8 June 2014 IGF Combined World Amateur Golf Rankings.

Individual

Team

Gymnastics

Artistic Gymnastics

New Zealand qualified one athlete based on its performance at the 2014 Oceania Artistic Gymnastics Championships.

Girls

Trampoline

New Zealand qualified one athlete based on its performance at the 2014 Oceania Trampoline Championships.

Rowing

New Zealand qualified two boats based on its performance at the 2013 World Rowing Junior Championships.

Qualification Legend: FA=Final A (medal); FB=Final B (non-medal); FC=Final C (non-medal); FD=Final D (non-medal); SA/B=Semifinals A/B; SC/D=Semifinals C/D; R=Repechage

Sailing

New Zealand qualified two boats based on its performance at the Techno 293 Oceania Continental Qualifiers. New Zealand later qualified one more boat based on its performance at the Byte CII Oceania Continental Qualifiers.

Swimming

New Zealand qualified four swimmers.

Boys

Girls

Mixed

Table Tennis

New Zealand qualified one athlete based on its performance at the Road to Nanjing series.

Singles

Team

Qualification Legend: Q=Main Bracket (medal); qB=Consolation Bracket (non-medal)

Triathlon

New Zealand qualified two athletes based on its performance at the 2014 Oceania Youth Olympic Games Qualifier.

Individual

Relay

Weightlifting

New Zealand qualified 1 quota in the boys' events based on the team ranking after the 2014 Weightlifting Oceania Championships.

Boys

Wrestling

New Zealand qualified five athletes based on its performance at the 2014 Oceania Cadet Championships.

Boys

Girls

References

2014 in New Zealand sport
Nations at the 2014 Summer Youth Olympics
New Zealand at the Youth Olympics